Invenio Business Solutions is a UK-based SAP and MuleSoft partner company, that delivers IT solutions and consulting services for organizations in the media and manufacturing & logistics verticals.

History 
Invenio Business Solutions was founded in 2006 by Manish Goyal. Headquartered in Reading, United Kingdom, the company has over 950 employees working worldwide and has offices spanning across seven countries including UK, India, Mauritius, Saudi Arabia, Fiji, United States and UAE. 
In 2019, Invenio acquired Proverbium, a Bangalore-based logistics consultancy.

Invenio Business Solutions and Fiji Revenue and Customs Services (FRCS) have launched a digital online system based on SAP S/4HANA to improve taxpayer experiences and Fiji’s trade environment.

In 2019, Invenio launched a new VAT system for the National Bureau for Revenue (NBR) in the kingdom of Bahrain. The company is featured in the list "50 Customers in 50 Days of SAP"

Funding 
In 2019, Invenio secured £11.6 million funding from BGF, the UK's most active investment company to expand its services and grow through acquisition.

Recognition 
2020 - Ranked 29 in the 11th annual Sunday Times HSBC International Track 200

2019 - Received "Thames Valley Awards" under International Tech Company category

2019 - Named in "The Sunday Times Tech Track List of 100 companies"

2015 - Won "SAP quality award" under Fast Delivery Category

2014 - Named in "The Sunday Times Tech Track List of 100 companies"

2014 - Invenio was a recipient of "2014's SAP Regional Partner Excellence Award"

2013 - Named in "The Sunday Times Tech Track List of 100 companies"

2013 - Secured 291st position in "Deloitte Technology Fast 500 list"

2012 - Named in "The Sunday Times Tech Track list of 100 companies"

References

External links 
Official Website
Management Consulting Firm
Red Wagon Workplace Solutions
Invenio Business Solutions on The Economic Times

Technology companies established in 2006
Technology companies of the United Kingdom
Information technology consulting firms of the United Kingdom 
British companies established in 2006
2006 establishments in England
Companies based in Reading, Berkshire